Pioneer Hall is a historic school building in Pleasant Hill, Tennessee, U.S.. It was built for the American Missionary Association from 1887 to 1889, and designed by Reverend Benjamin Dodge, a Congregationalist from Maine. It has been listed on the National Register of Historic Places since November 21, 1978. It is now known as the Pioneer Hall Museum.

References

School buildings on the National Register of Historic Places in Tennessee
School buildings completed in 1889
Museums in Cumberland County, Tennessee
American Missionary Association